The IPSC European Shotgun Championship is an IPSC level 4 championship hosted every third year in Europe.

History 
 1987 October 8-11, Great Britain
 2003 August 27-30, Terni, Italy
 2006 September 6-9, Kavala, Greece
 2009 September 15-18, Oparany, Czech Republic

The first IPSC European Shotgun Championship was held in October 1987 at the National Shooting Centre in Bisley, England, a couple of days before the seventh IPSC European Handgun Championship at the same shooting range.

Champions 
The following is a list of current and past IPSC European Shotgun Champions.

Overall category

Lady category

Junior category

Senior category

Super Senior category

See also 
 IPSC European Handgun Championship
 IPSC European Rifle Championship

References

IPSC Continental Championships
Match Results - 2003 IPSC European Shotgun Championship
Match Results - 2006 IPSC European Shotgun Championship
Match Results - 2009 IPSC European Shotgun Championship

IPSC shooting competitions
European championships
Shooting sports in Europe by country